Lester C. Hunt (1892–1954), U.S. Senator from Wyoming from 1949 to 1954. Senator Hunt may refer to:

Alvah Hunt (1790s–1858), New York State Senate
George F. Hunt (1831–1888), Wisconsin State Senate
George Hunt (attorney) (1841–1901), Illinois State Senate
Jarvis Hunt (politician) (1904–1994), Massachusetts State Senate
John E. Hunt (1908–1989), New Jersey State Senate
Megan Hunt (politician) (born 1986), Nebraska State Senate
Neal Hunt (born 1942), North Carolina State Senate
Samuel Furman Hunt (1844–1907), Ohio State Senate
Stuart Hunt (1927–2014), Vermont State Senate
Walter Hunt (politician) (1868–1942),  Wisconsin State Senate